The Voronya is a river on the Kola Peninsula in Murmansk Oblast, Russia. It is 155 km in length. The area of its drainage basin is 9,940 km². The Voronya flows out of Lake Lovozero and into the Barents Sea.

There are two hydroelectric power stations on the river, with a total capacity of 351 MW and an annual production of 1069 GWh.

References

Rivers of Murmansk Oblast